Christian Schaller (born 4 November 1937) is a German architect working in Cologne and the Rhineland.

Career 
Born in Berlin, Schaller grew up in Höxter with his mother; his father  had been appointed to the municipal reconstruction company in Cologne in 1947. Christian Schaller studied architecture in Hanover, Karlsruhe and at the Technical University of Berlin under , where he graduated as Diplom-Ingenieur in 1965.

Christian Schaller carried out further church construction projects in office partnership with his father (Schaller & Schaller GbR). However, he strove early on to develop quarters instead of individual buildings, and in 1968, together with other architects, he founded (other data 1971) the design team 8 (dt8) planning group, with which he was active until 1991, focusing on public participation, urban design and housing construction. In 1978, for example, the group won the competition for the residential development on the site of the former Stollwerck chocolate factory in Cologne's Severinsviertel, which was completed in 1985.

The dt8 group finally disbanded in 1995; Schaller worked with founding member Helmut Theodor as Büro Schaller/Theodor Architekten from 1992 until Theodor retired in 2011.

In the course of the redesign of the surroundings of the Cologne Cathedral, in which the  designed by Fritz Schaller - equipped with geometric-brutalistic elements - was to be heavily modified, Schaller developed the decisive concept for the north side with stairs and station forecourt - and also asserted his copyright to the extent that he was able to implement this concept himself until 2006. This period also saw a major urban development project in Tianjin, China, which he implemented in several sections together with other partners.

From 2015 he operated as Schaller Partner GbR, and from 2017 as Schaller Architekten Stadtplaner BDA..
Schaller was involved in the board of the Association of German Architects from 1992 to 2007 and was chairman of the Association of German Architects from 2011 to 2014 . Außerdem ist er Mitglied im Architektur Forum Rheinland und im Deutscher Werkbund NRW. In these functions and beyond, he regularly participates in the most relevant urban planning discussions in Cologne.

Realisations

With Fritz Schaller 
 1966–1968: St. Paulus in

dt8 
 1974: Wohnhaussiedlung Am Wäldchen, Meckenheim-Merl
 1978–1985: Wohnbebauung ehemaliges Stollwerck-Gelände
 1988: Sanierung und Ausbau der denkmalgeschützten Kriegsruine eines Jugendstilhauses, Hülchrather Straße 3, Cologne.
 1990: "Anno-Riegel", Former Stollwerck site.

Schaller/Theodor or Schaller Partner 
 1994: Wohnbebauung Beethovenpark, Cologne
 2000: U-Bahnhof mit Busbahnhof und P+R Tiefgarage Bensberg.
 2004: , Conversion into an event venue with restaurant.
 2006: Neubau der Kölner Domtreppe und Neugestaltung des Bahnhofvorplatzes Köln
 2006: Eisenbahnversicherungskasse Wohn- und Bürogebäude, Volksgartenstraße, Cologne
 2015: , Cologne

Awards 
 1971: , Herrenschuhladen De Lorenzi
 1975: Kölner Architekturpreis für Modegeschäft Hermès
 1980: Kölner Architekturpreis für denkmalgerechte Sanierung des Gasthofes Em Ahle Kohberg, Cologne Merheim
 1985: Kölner Architekturpreis für Stollwerck-Gelände, Cologne
 1988: Auszeichnung Landeswettbewerb, "Ökologisches Bauen" für Hülchrather Straße 3, Cologne
 1989: Auszeichnung vorbildlicher Bauten im Lande Nordrhein-Westfalen für die Stollwerck-Bebauungen.
 1990: Kölner Architekturpreis für die Sanierung der , Cologne
 1990: Kölner Architekturpreis für den Anno-Riegel (Stollwerck-Gelände). Cologne
 1995: Recognition of the German Architecture Award for the Beethovenpark residential development.
 1998: BDA Award for Good Buildings District Group Ruhr Area
 2006: Recognition Cologne Architecture Prize for the new cathedral staircase.

References 

20th-century German architects
21st-century German architects
1937 births
Living people
Architects from Berlin